Sousa Munhawa is a Mozambican politician. She was a member of the Pan-African Parliament in 2004 and a member of the Health Committee.

References

Year of birth missing (living people)
Living people
Members of the Pan-African Parliament from Mozambique